Keepsake was an American emo/screamo band formed in 1997 by Paul Geller, Mark Silva and Duane Hosein in Coral Springs, Florida. Hosein joined the band An Acre Lost (which changed name to Poison the Well in 1998) and ultimately had to quit Keepsake. He was replaced by Shane Halpern, former vocalist of An Acre Lost. After releasing three albums and EP on the independent label, Eulogy Recordings and Fearless Records, Geller left the band for personal reasons. He also produced three records for RED Music-distributed Undecided Records artists Shindig, Hearts Over Rome and Cru Jones. Geller moved into digital music and worked as EVP of Information Products at Grooveshark.

Jesse Kriz was later a part of Actions Speak Louder and Until the End. They also appeared on Punk Goes Pop with the song "The Way You Love Me".

Members

Final lineup
 Shane Halpern – lead vocals (1998–2003), guitar, synths (2001–2003)
 Robert Yapkowitz – guitar (2000–2003), bass (2003)
 Jesse Kriz – drums, background vocals (2000–2003)
 Derek Carty – bass (2003)

Former members and touring musicians

 Duane Hosein – lead vocals (1997–1998)
 Dan Mazin – bass (1997–1998)
 Trevor Short – bass (1998–1999)
 Tommy Trimble – bass (2000–2001)
 Justin Manlove – bass (2001–2002)
 Brian Pugh – bass (2002–2003)
 Jesse Steele – bass (2003)
 Paul Geller – lead guitar, bass, backing vocals (1997–2001)
 Mark Silva  – rhythm guitar (1997–2000)
 Mykee Shaffer – guitar (2003)
 Colby Hooper – drums (1998–2000)
 Chris Hornbrook – drums (2000)
 Adam Gobble
 Richard O'Neil

Discography
 The Things I Would Say (1998, Eulogy Recordings)
 She Hums Like a Radio (EP, 2000, Red Dawn Records; re-issued by Eulogy Recordings)
 The End of Sound (2001, Eulogy Recordings)
 Black Dress in a B Movie (2003, Fearless Records)

Related bands
 Until the End - Dan Mazin, Jesse Kriz
 The Cartoon Life - Shane Halpern
 Harbour Lights - Shane Halpern
 A Jealousy Issue -Duane Hosein
 Poison The Well - Shane Halpern

References

Further reading

External links
Keepsake Biographyfrom Allmusic.com

Emo musical groups from Florida
Eulogy Recordings artists
Fearless Records artists
Musical groups established in 1997
Musical groups disestablished in 2003
Musical groups from Coral Springs, Florida